Patryk Plewka (born 2 January 2000) is a Polish professional footballer who plays as a midfielder for Wisła Kraków.

Career

Wisła Kraków
Plewka is a product of Wisła Kraków and got his first team debut in July 2018. On 2 September 2019, Plewka joined Stal Rzeszów on loan for the rest of the season.

References

External links

2000 births
People from Chrzanów County
Sportspeople from Lesser Poland Voivodeship
Living people
Polish footballers
Association football midfielders
Wisła Kraków players
Stal Rzeszów players
Ekstraklasa players
II liga players